An unclassified language is a language whose genetic affiliation to other languages has not been established. Languages can be unclassified for a variety of reasons, mostly due to a lack of reliable data but sometimes due to the confounding influence of language contact, if different layers of its vocabulary or morphology point in different directions and it is not clear which represents the ancestral form of the language. Some poorly known extinct languages, such as Gutian and Cacán, are simply unclassifiable, and it is unlikely the situation will ever change.

A supposedly unclassified language may turn out not to be a language at all, or even a distinct dialect, but merely a family, tribal or village name, or an alternative name for a people or language that is classified. 

If a language's genetic relationship has not been established after significant documentation of the language and comparison with other languages and families, as in the case of Basque in Europe, it is considered a language isolate – that is, it is classified as a language family of its own. An 'unclassified' language therefore is one which may still turn out to belong to an established family once better data is available or more thorough comparative research is done. Extinct unclassified languages for which little evidence has been preserved are likely to remain in limbo indefinitely, unless lost documents or a surviving speaking population are discovered.

Classification challenges

An example of a language that has caused multiple problems for classification is Mimi of Decorse in Chad. This language is only attested in a single word list collected ca. 1900. At first it was thought to be a Maban language, because of similarities to Maba, the first Maban language to be described. However, as other languages of the Maban family were described, it became clear that the similarities were solely with Maba itself, and the relationship was too distant for Mimi to be related specifically to Maba and not equally to the other Maban languages. The obvious similarities are therefore now thought to be due to borrowings from Maba, which is the socially dominant language in the area. When such loans are discounted, there is much less data to classify Mimi with, and what does remain is not particularly similar to any other language or language family. Mimi might therefore be a language isolate, or perhaps a member of some other family related to Maban in the proposed but as yet undemonstrated Nilo-Saharan phylum. It would be easier to address the problem with better data, but no-one has been able to find speakers of the language again.

It also happens that a language may be unclassified within an established family. That is, it may be obvious that it is, say, a Malayo-Polynesian language, but not clear in which branch of Malayo-Polynesian it belongs. When a family consists of many similar languages with great degree of confusing contact, a large number of languages may be effectively unclassified in this manner. Families where this is a substantial problem include Malayo-Polynesian, Bantu, Pama–Nyungan, and Arawakan.

Examples by reason

There are hundreds of unclassified languages, most of them extinct, although there are some, albeit relatively few, that are still spoken; in the following list, the extinct languages are labeled with a dagger (†).

Absence of data

These languages are unclassifiable, not just unclassified, because while there may be record of a language existing there may not be enough materials in it to analyze and classify, especially with now-extinct languages. (See, for example, a list of unclassified languages of South America.)

 Sentinelese (Andaman Islands) – a living presumed language of an uncontacted people
 Weyto† (Ethiopia)
 Nam† (Chinese–Tibetan border) – data remains undeciphered
 Harappan† (Indus Valley civilisation 33rd–13th centuries BC) – data remains undeciphered
 Cypro-Minoan† (Cyprus 15th–10th centuries BC) – data remains undeciphered
 Lullubi† (Iran)
 † (Tanzania)
 Guale† and Yamasee† (US)
 Himarimã (Brazil) – a living presumed language of an uncontacted people
 Nagarchal† (India) – assumed to have been Dravidian

Scarcity of data
Many of these languages are also considered unclassifiable, as the amount of data may not be enough to reveal close relatives if there were some. For others there may be enough data to show the language belongs to a particular family, but not where within it, or to show the language has no close relatives, but not enough to conclude that it is a language isolate. 

 Solano† (Mexico)
 Cacán† (Argentina)
 Kujargé (Chad)
 Bung (Cameroon)
 Luo (Cameroon)
 Mawa† (Nigeria)
 Komta† (Nigeria)
 Wawu† (Ghana or Ivory Coast?)
 †? (West Africa)
 Dima-Bottego† (Ethiopia)
 Kwadi† (Angola)
 Philistine language† (Palestine)
 Iberian language† (Spain and southern France)
 Lemnian† (Lemnos, Greece)
 Minoan† (ancient Crete)
 Eteocretan† (ancient Crete)
 Hattic† (Anatolia)
 Kaskian† (Anatolia, possibly related to Hattic)
 Kassite† (Iraq)
 Gutian† (Zagros borderlands)
 Hunnic† (Eastern Europe & Central Asia)
 Xiongnu† (Mongolia)
 Xianbei† (Mongolia)
 Ruanruan† (Mongolia)
 Khitan† (Mongolia)

Unrelated to nearby languages and not commonly examined
 Bangime (Mali)
 Jalaa† (Nigeria)
 Kwaza (Brazil)
 Mpre† (Ghana)

Basic vocabulary unrelated to other languages
 Bayot (Senegal)
 Laal (Chad)

Not closely related to other languages and no academic consensus
 Ongota (Ethiopia)
 Shabo (Ethiopia)
 Omaio (Tanzania)

Languages of dubious existence

 Oropom (Uganda) (extinct, if it existed)
 Imeraguen (Mauritania)
 Nemadi (Mauritania)
 Rer Bare (Ethiopia) (extinct, if it existed)
 Wutana (Nigeria) (extinct, if it existed)
 Trojan (Anatolia) (as yet unattested, possibly a Luwian dialect)

Some 'languages' turn out to be fabricated, as Kukurá of Brazil.

See also
 :Category:Unclassified languages
 List of unclassified languages according to the Ethnologue
 List of unclassified languages of North America
 List of unclassified languages of South America
 Language isolate
 List of language families (including isolates and unclassified languages)

Notes

References

External links

Ethnologue: Unclassified languages